John James Hugh Henry Stewart-Murray, 7th Duke of Atholl, KT (6 August 1840 – 20 January 1917), styled Marquess of Tullibardine between 1846 and 1864, was a Scottish peer.

Background and education
Atholl was the only child of George Murray, 6th Duke of Atholl, and Anne, daughter of Henry Home-Drummond. He was educated at Eton.

Career

Atholl served in the Scots Fusilier Guards, achieving the rank of captain in 1864. The latter year he also succeeded his father in the dukedom. In 1865 he registered the additional surname of Stewart at the Lyon Court. From 1878 to 1917 he served as Lord-Lieutenant of Perthshire. He was appointed a Knight of the Thistle in 1868 and was Chancellor of the Order of the Thistle from 1913 until his death. He is also remembered for having devoted years of his life to editing the records of the family and the related history.

Family
A few months before he succeeded his father, Lord Tullibardine married in 1863 Louisa Moncreiffe (11 June 1844 – 8 July 1902), daughter of Sir Thomas Moncreiffe of that Ilk, 7th Baronet. She took great interest in the Scottish Horse, a military regiment raised by her son Lord Tullibardine for service in South Africa during the Second Boer War (1899-1902), and one of her latest public events was to assist in the equipment of a reinforcement company for the regiment in early 1902.
The Duchess of Atholl died in Italy on 9 July 1902, aged 58.

The Duke of Atholl remained a widower until his death at Blair Castle in January 1917, aged 76.

The couple had four sons (of whom the eldest died in infancy) and three daughters (all of whom survived to adulthood), including the Scottish folklorist Lady Evelyn Stewart Murray, and the collector of early Scottish music, Lady Dorothea Ruggles-Brise. After his death, the dukedom passed to his second but eldest surviving son, John Stewart-Murray, 8th Duke of Atholl, and later to his third son, Major James Stewart-Murray, 9th Duke of Atholl also known as James Murray. The 7th Duke has no known surviving descendants.

Children
Lady Dorothea Louisa Stewart-Murray b. 1866; married Major Harold Goodeve Ruggles-Brise
Lady Helen Stewart-Murray b. 1867;
Lady Evelyn Stewart-Murray (1868–1940)
John Stewart-Murray (1869–1869), Marquess of Tullibardine – died in infancy
John George Stewart-Murray (1871–1942), Marquess of Tullibardine later 8th Duke of Atholl; 
Major Lord George Stewart-Murray (1873–1914)
Lord James Thomas Stewart-Murray (1879–1957), later 9th Duke of Atholl

References

External links

 

|-

107
1840 births
1917 deaths
Knights of the Thistle
Lord-Lieutenants of Perthshire
People educated at Eton College
John
19th-century Scottish people
People of Byzantine descent
People of the Victorian era
Dukes of Rannoch
Barons Strange